Sunset of Power is a 1936 American Western film directed by Ray Taylor, written by Earle Snell, and starring Buck Jones, Dorothy Dix, Charles Middleton, Donald Kirke, Ben Corbett and Charles King. It was released on January 22, 1936, by Universal Pictures.

Plot

Cast 
Buck Jones as Cliff Lea
Dorothy Dix as Ruth Brannum
Charles Middleton as Neil Brannum 
Donald Kirke as Page Cothran
Ben Corbett as Red
Charles King as Jim Coley
W. E. Lawrence as Bud Rolfe 
Nina Campana as Rosita 
Murdock MacQuarrie as Doctor
Eumenio Blanco as Andreas
Allan Sears as Henchman Mack
Robert McKenzie as Storekeeper
Joe De La Cruz as Indian Joe

References

External links 
 

1936 films
American Western (genre) films
1936 Western (genre) films
Universal Pictures films
Films directed by Ray Taylor
American black-and-white films
1930s English-language films
1930s American films